Granfelt is a Nordic surname that may refer to
Ben Granfelt (born 1963), Finnish guitarist
Erik Granfelt (1883–1962), Swedish gymnast, brother of Nils and Hans 
George Granfelt (1865–1917), Finnish lawyer and politician
Hans Granfelt (1897–1963), Swedish fencer and discus thrower
Hanna Granfelt (1884-1952), Finnish opera singer
Hjalmar Granfelt (1874–1957), Finnish legal scholar, professor and politician
Nils Granfelt (1887–1959), Swedish gymnast, brother of Erik and Hans